Moana is a closed railway station in Adelaide, South Australia. It was a ground level stopping place during the passenger transport days of this line, and a 1965 reference mentioned that it was no longer used at that date.

There was a smaller stop following this called 'Noarlunga Sand Siding' opened in 1928 for loading sand which closed in September 1950. A 1965 reference remarks that traces of the old siding could still be seen at that date on the curve before Pedlars Creek Road crossing.

The Seaford railway station, built in 2014 on the Seaford railway line, is located approximately 300m from the site of Moana station. The Willunga line closed in 1969 and was dismantled in 1972.

References

Australian Railway Historical Society Bulletin No 336, October 1965

Disused railway stations in South Australia